Ugly may refer to:
 Ugliness, a property of a person or thing that is unpleasant to look at, listen to or contemplate

Music

Albums 
 Ugly (Life of Agony album), 1995
 Ugly (Screaming Females album), 2012
Ugly (Slowthai album), 2023

Songs 
 "Ugly" (Bubba Sparxxx song), 2001
 "Ugly" (Fantasia song), 2016
 "Ugly" (Jaira Burns song), 2017
 "Ugly" (Jon Bon Jovi song), 1998
 "Ugly" (Sevendust song), 2005
 "Ugly" (Sugababes song), 2005
 "U.G.L.Y.", by Daphne & Celeste, 2000 
 "Ugly", by 2NE1 on their EP 2NE1
 "Ugly", by Juliana Hatfield on her album Hey Babe
 "Ugly", by The Smashing Pumpkins on their single "1979"
 "Ugly", by Pooh Shiesty on his album Shiesty Season
 "Ugly", a Ella Henderson song from her second album Everything I Didn't Say (2022)
 "Ugly", by The Exies from their album Head for the Door, 2004

Other 
 Ugly (film), a 2013 film
 "Ugly" (House), a television series episode
 "Ugly", an autobiography by Constance Briscoe
 Ugly Creek (disambiguation)
 Ugly Models, a modelling and actors' agency in London, UK
 Ugly Mountain, a mountain in the U.S. state of West Virginia

See also 
 Uglies, a 2005 science fiction novel by Scott Westerfeld
 Ugli fruit or Jamaican tangelo
 Ugley, a village in Essex, England, United Kingdom